Wing Commander David William Holford  (21 February 1921 – 17 December 1943) was a Royal Air Force officer who was the youngest bomber squadron commanding officer in RAF history. He was killed after crashing his Lancaster in thick fog near Kelstern following an operation to bomb Berlin (the infamous Black Thursday).

RAF career
Holford was inspired to join the RAF when his uncle Air Com D’Arcy Greig won the 1929 Schneider Trophy in a Napier engined Supermarine S5. Greig gave him his leather flying helmet and his destiny was cast (source, his widow Joan Holford).

Holford joined the RAF in 1938 aged 17. After pilot training he had become a Wellington bomber pilot with 99 Squadron at RAF Newmarket in March 1940. At Newmarket he flew 11 operations as a second pilot. He flew six missions with Flight Lieutenant Percy Pickard, who later portrayed the fictional Squadron Leader Dickson, in the 1941 propaganda film, Target for Tonight.

By June 1940 Holford was captain of his own aircraft and completed a further 15 operations. For nursing a severely damaged aircraft back from an operation he was Mentioned in Despatches and later received the Distinguished Flying Cross (DFC) before a promotion to Flying Officer and becoming an instructor at RAF Bassingbourn.

For his actions that day, Holford was awarded the Distinguished Service Order (DSO) and promoted to squadron leader aged just 21.

Holford flew the four-engined Halifax bomber and trained and flew operations with 103 Squadron before converting to Lancasters. After marrying Joan, a WAAF RAF Intelligence Officer, left Elsham Wolds for a flight commander position at RAF Lindholme. His still flew actively, attacking Berlin on 17 January 1943.

Just four days before his 22nd birthday in February 1943, Holford was promoted to Wing Commander, the youngest man to hold this rank in Bomber Command and one of the youngest in the history of the RAF.

On 21 November he was posted to Waltham to take command of 100 Squadron. On 16 December 1943, 100 Squadron received orders to attack Berlin. Holford piloted a Lancaster for the attack. The raid became known as 'Black Thursday' as 25 aircraft were lost on the raid and 28 crashed (and four abandoned as the crew baled out) in England where airfields had become fog-bound. Seeking to land at RAF Grimsby, Holford's Lancaster flew into the ground near Kelstern with only the wireless operator and tail gunner surviving.

Honours and awards
 22 October 1940 – Pilot Officer David William Holford (41704) awarded the Distinguished Flying Cross.
 11 August 1942 – Acting Squadron Leader David William Holford, DFC (41704), No. 103 Squadron is awarded the Distinguished Service Order.

Notes

References

1921 births
1943 deaths
Royal Air Force wing commanders
British World War II pilots
British World War II bomber pilots
Royal Air Force personnel killed in World War II
Companions of the Distinguished Service Order
Recipients of the Distinguished Flying Cross (United Kingdom)
People from Kingston upon Thames